The  is an expressway on Okinawa Island in Okinawa Prefecture, Japan. The Ministry of Land, Infrastructure, Transport and Tourism maintains most of the expressway, but the West Nippon Expressway Company is the owner and operator of a short section of the expressway at its eastern end. It is signed E58 as a spur route of the Okinawa Expressway under the "2016 Proposal for Realization of Expressway Numbering". It also carries the entire length of National Route 506.

History

The Naha Airport Expressway first opened on 23 June 2000 between its eastern terminus at the junction with the Okinawa Expressway and Haebaru-minami Interchange. It was extended further west on 26 April 2003 from Haebaru-minami Interchange to Tomigusuku Interchange. It was extended to its current western terminus at Tomigusuku-Nakachi Interchange on 22 March 2008.

Junction list
The entire expressway is in Okinawa Prefecture.

References

Roads in Okinawa Prefecture
Expressways in Japan
2000 establishments in Japan